Big Little Lies may refer to:

Big Little Lies (novel), a 2014 novel written by Liane Moriarty
Big Little Lies (TV series), a 2017 American television series based on the novel adapted by David E. Kelley